Regina Dourado (August 22, 1952 – October 27, 2012) was a Brazilian film and television actress.

Dourado was born in Irecê, Bahia, Brazil, on August 22, 1952. She joined the Companhia Baiana de Comédias, a theater group, when she was fifteen years old. She became known for numerous television, film and theater roles throughout her career.

Dourado died at the Hospital Português in Salvador, Brazil, on October 27, 2012, at the age of 60. Dourado, who had battled breast cancer since 2003, was survived by her son, Leonardo Dourado.

Filmography

Film credits

References

External links

1952 births
2012 deaths
Brazilian film actresses
Brazilian television actresses
Brazilian stage actresses
People from Bahia